The Monastir Military High School (Manastır Askerî İdadisi), established in 1847, was one of the three-year educational military high schools of the Ottoman Empire. It was located in Monastir (present day Bitola, North Macedonia). The buildings of the school have been used as museums since 1934 (today NI Institute and Museum Bitola).

The other military high schools of the Ottoman Empire were: Constantinople Military High School (Kuleli Military High School) and Bursa Military High School, both founded in 1846; the Edirne Military High School and Monastir Military High School, founded in 1847; the Damascus Military High School, founded in 1848; the Erzurum Military High School, founded in 1873; and the Baghdad Military High School, founded in 1876.

Notable alumni

 Mustafa Kemal Atatürk (1881–1938), the founder of modern Turkey, who attended from 1896 to 1898
 Ahmed Niyazi Bey (1873–1912), a leader of the 1908 Young Turk Revolution
 Bekir Fikri (1882-1914), military officer
 Hüseyin Avni Zaimler (1877–1930), military officer and MP in the Grand National Assembly of Turkey
 Fethi Okyar (1880–1943), second Prime Minister of Turkey
 Fuat Bulca (1881–1962), military officer and MP in the Grand National Assembly of Turkey
 Salih Bozok (1881–1941), military officer and MP in the Grand National Assembly of Turkey
 Nuri Conker (1882–1937), military officer and MP in the Grand National Assembly of Turkey
 Hüsrev Gerede (1884–1962), military officer and MP in the Grand National Assembly of Turkey
 Cevat Abbas Gürer (1887–1943), military officer and MP in the Grand National Assembly of Turkey
 Ali Shefqet Shkupi, military officer and first Chief of Supreme Staff of the Albanian Army

See also
 Education in the Ottoman Empire

Further reading
 Yusuf Çam, Atatürk'ün Okuduğu Dönemde Askerî Okullar: Rüştiye, İdadî, Harbiye, 1892-1902, Genelkurmay Basım Evi, 1991.

External links
NI Institute and Museum Bitola (Bitola Museum Website)

Education in Bitola
Military high schools
History of Bitola
Ottoman architecture in North Macedonia
Macedonia under the Ottoman Empire
Manastir vilayet
Ottoman Army
Schools in the Ottoman Empire
Military education and training in the Ottoman Empire
Educational institutions established in 1847
1847 establishments in the Ottoman Empire